Melvin "Mel" Edwards (born May 4, 1937) is an American contemporary artist, teacher, and abstract steel-metal sculptor. Additionally he has worked in drawing and printmaking. His artwork has political content often referencing African-American history, as well as the exploration of themes within slavery. Visually his works are characterized by the use of straight-edged triangular and rectilinear forms in metal. He lives between Upstate New York and in Plainfield, New Jersey.

He has had more than a dozen one-person show exhibits and been in over four dozen group shows. Edwards has had solo exhibitions at the Whitney Museum of American Art in New York City, the Los Angeles County Museum of Art (LACMA), and the New Jersey State Museum, Trenton, New Jersey.

Early life and education 
Melvin Eugene Edwards, Jr., was born May 4, 1937, in Houston, Texas, to Thelmarie Edwards and Melvin Edwards Sr, and was the eldest of his parents' four children. His father worked for Houston Lighting & Power and his parents divorced in early childhood. He was raised in Dayton, Ohio for five years, but by middle school age the family moved back to Houston. Edwards is black and grew up in Houston during a time of racial segregation. He attended E. O. Smith Junior High School and Phillis Wheatley High School. He was a creator from a young age and was encouraged by his parents with his father building his first easel when he was 14 years old. Edwards was introduced to abstract art by a high school teacher. While attending high school he started to take art classes at the Museum of Fine Arts, Houston.

In 1955 he moved to southern California to pursue studies at Los Angeles City College. Edwards transferred schools to study art and play football at University of Southern California (USC), where he received his B.F.A. degree in 1965. While attending USC, Edwards took a history course that was rooted in a European-centric view, which upset him and fueled him to learn more about African history. This inspired his travel to Africa five years later.

He attended Los Angeles County Art Institute (known as Otis College of Art and Design) during breaks from USC to study sculpture with Renzo Fenci. Additionally, he was mentored by Hungarian-American painter Francis de Erdely, and studied under Hal Gebhardt, Hans Burkhardt, and Edward Ewing.

Teaching 
In 1965, he went on to teach at the Chouinard Art Institute (now known as the California Institute of the Arts) until 1967. He moved to New York City in 1967. Additionally he taught at Orange County Community College in New York (1967–1969), and the University of Connecticut (1970–1972).

In 1972, he began teaching art classes at Livingston College of Rutgers University, (now part of the Rutgers School of Arts and Sciences). By 1980 he was a full professor and teaching at the Mason Gross School of Creative and Performing Arts at Rutgers University. By 2002, he retired from teaching.

Art career 
His first one-person exhibition was held at the Santa Barbara Museum of Art, Santa Barbara, California, in 1965. Edwards cited jazz music as an influence to his work.

In 1965, Edwards was working in Los Angeles as a driver for a film company, on his breaks he would visit Tamarind Print Institute. It was at Tamarind where he met many influential national artists such as George Sugarman, Richard Hunt, Leon Golub, Louise Nevelson, and Gabriel Kohn. Later in that year, Sugarman had a New York University art exhibition which Edwards photographed for him. At that exhibition, he met Al Held and he asked him for a job and Held pointed him to a recent Yale University graduate, painter William T. Williams. The two artists went on to have a very close partnership continuing to this day.

In 1970, Edwards took his first trip to Africa, visiting the West African republics of Nigeria, Togo, Benin, and Ghana. This trip influenced his work, and was followed by other visits to Africa over the years.

Work

Smokehouse (1968 – 1970) 
Smokehouse (also known as Smokehouse Associates, Smokehouse Collective, Smokehouse Painters) was a New York City-based community "wall painting" initiative created in part by Melvin Edwards and William T. Williams, spanning from 1968 until 1970. The project existed as a social experiment asking the question "can abstraction solve social justice?" The wall paintings consisted of hard edge graphics and geometric patterns, occurring between 120th street and 125th street of Harlem. It was born out of the pondering of how the 19th-century tradition of stacking houses affected the human psyche and Melvin Edwards believed there is a strong correlation between living spaces and the lives of people. He mentions this in an interview at the Soul of a Nation Symposium in 2018 stating: "If you change places, you can change the lives of people." Edwards wanted the public to participate in the way cities were developing. In every project, Smokehouse would hire someone elderly within the community and someone young.

These murals were small scale- never going pass 16 ft or higher due to the height restrictions of the initiatives ladder. Nevertheless, Smokehouse painted alleyways, tops of buildings, and sides of buildings. William T. Williams handled the logistics of the organization. As the project continued, MOMA patron Celeste Bartos and David Rockefeller underwrote these projects. The more recognition they got the bigger people wanted them to go. They didn't feel comfortable going too large.

121st and Sylvan still have the annual tradition of doing a community-based mural project because of Smokehouse.

Lynch Fragments series (1963 – present) 

Edwards' work Some Bright Morning (1963) started his series called, Lynch Fragments and was a reference to Ralph Ginzburg's anthology, 100 Years of Lynchings (1962). The series now has more than 200 pieces. Inspired by the turmoil of the Civil Rights Movement, these small-scale welded metal wall reliefs were developed in three periods: 1963 to 1967, 1973 to 1974, and 1978 to the present. Edwards created the series as metaphor of the struggles experienced by African Americans. A variety of metal objects are employed as the raw materials for these works, including hammer heads, scissors, locks, chains, and railroad splices. The sculptures, usually no more than a foot tall, are hung on the wall at eye level.

Rocker series 
Edwards is also known for smaller freestanding works, the kinetic "Rockers" series. Works from the Rocker series include, Homage to Coco (1970), Good Friends in Chicago (1972), Avenue B (Rocker) (1975), Memories of Coco (1980), A Conversation with Norman Lewis (1980), among others. These moving sculptures are inspired by his memories, including one of him falling off his grandmother's rocking chair and another as a homage to his friendships. Edwards used the term "syncopate" to describe the interaction while rocking, and the relationship of syncopation in African-American music.

Other work 
He is also known for works executed in the medium of printmaking.

His large-scale, public art works include, Homage to My Father and the Spirit (1969, Cornell University, Appel Commons, Ithaca, New York), Pyramid Up and Down Pyramid (1969, re-fabricated 2017, Whitney Museum of American Art, New York City), Homage to Billie Holiday and the Young Ones at Soweto (1977, Morgan State University, Baltimore, Maryland), Out of the Struggles of the Past to a Brilliant Future (1982, Mt Vernon Plaza, Columbus, Ohio), and Breaking of the Chains (1995, San Diego, California).

Exhibitions 
Edwards has participated in a large number of solo shows in the United States and internationally. His solo shows include Melvin Edwards (1965), Santa Barbara Museum of Art, California; Melvin Edwards: Sculptor (1978), Studio Museum in Harlem, New York; The Sculpture of Melvin Edwards, SculptureCenter, New York; Mel Edwards: Lynch Fragment Series (1985), Robeson Gallery, Rutgers University, New Brunswick, New Jersey; and Melvin Edwards (2022), Dia Beacon, Beacon, New York.

A 30-year retrospective of his sculpture was held in 1993 at the Neuberger Museum of Art, Purchase, New York, and a 50-year retrospective titled Melvin Edwards: Five Decades was held in 2015 at the Nasher Sculpture Center, Dallas.

He has also participated in many group exhibitions, including the 56th Venice Biennale (2015), Havana Biennial (2019), and Afro-Atlantic Histories (2018, 2021–2022).

Personal life 
He was married in 1960 to Karen Hamre, together they had three children. In 1969, the couple separated, Hamre and the children stayed in Los Angeles while Edwards had already moved to New York City.

In 1976, Edwards married the poet Jayne Cortez. Cortez and Edwards worked together: she wrote a series of poems to accompany her husband's work Lynch Fragments, and he illustrated her book Pissstained Stairs and the Monkey Man's Wares (1969).

His art studios are located in upstate New York and in Plainfield, New Jersey, and he often travels to Dakar, Senegal.

Awards and honors

 1975 – awarded a Guggenheim Fellowship.
1984 – grants from the National Endowment for the Arts (NEA).
1988 – Fulbright Fellowship to Zimbabwe from 1988–1989.
 1992 – elected into the National Academy of Design as an Associate, and became a full Academician in 1994.
2000 – Lab Grant Artist Residency Program, Dieu Donné, Brooklyn, New York
 He received an Honorary Doctorate of Fine Arts from the Massachusetts College of Art and Design (MassArt) in 2014.
 He is the subject of the 2016 documentary film by Lydie Diakhaté, entitled Some Bright Morning: The Art of Melvin Edwards.

Notable works in public collections 

August the Squared Fire (1965), San Francisco Museum of Modern Art
The Lifted X (1965), Museum of Modern Art, New York
The Fourth Circle (1966), Los Angeles County Museum of Art
Curtain (for William and Peter) (1969), Tate, London
Pyramid Up and Pyramid Down (1969, refabricated 2017), Whitney Museum, New York
Untitled (Wall Hanging) (1982), Crystal Bridges Museum of American Art, Bentonville, Arkansas
Working Thought (1985), from the series Lynch Fragments, Studio Museum in Harlem, New York
Justice for Tropic-Ana (dedicated to Ana Mendieta) (1986), from the series Lynch Fragments, Carnegie Museum of Art, Pittsburgh
Cup of? (1988), from the series Lynch Fragments, Museum of Modern Art, New York
Ready Now Now (1988), from the series Lynch Fragments, Metropolitan Museum of Art, New York
Takawira - J (1989), from the series Lynch Fragments, Brooklyn Museum, New York
Good Word from Cayenne (1990), from the series Lynch Fragments, Museum of Fine Arts, Houston
Tomorrow's Wind (1990), Thomas Jefferson Park, New York City Department of Parks and Recreation
Off and Gone (1992), from the series Lynch Fragments, Museum of Contemporary Art, Chicago
Tambo (1993), Smithsonian American Art Museum, Smithsonian Institution, Washington, D.C.
Siempre Gilberto de la Nuez (1994), from the series Lynch Fragments, National Gallery of Art, Washington, D.C.
Deni Malick (1999), from the series Lynch Fragments, Fralin Museum of Art, Charlottesville, Virginia
Fragments & Shadows (2001), Metropolitan Museum of Art, New York; and Museum of Modern Art, New York
Soba (2002), from the series Lynch Fragments, Detroit Institute of Arts
Scales of Injustice (2017/year of exhibition), Baltimore Museum of Art

See also 

 List of African-American visual artists

References

External links
Melvin Edwards website.
 Carol Kino, "Rediscovering Someone Recognized", The New York Times, October 17, 2012.
 Michael Brenson, BOMB magazine – Artists in Conversation, November 24, 2014
 Catherine Craft, "Conversations with Melvin Edwards", Nasher Sculpture Center.
 "NO. 170: Melvin Edwards, Gohar Dashti", The Modern Art Notes Podcast.

1937 births
Living people
20th-century African-American artists
20th-century American male artists
20th-century American sculptors
21st-century African-American artists
21st-century American sculptors
African-American contemporary artists
African-American sculptors
American contemporary artists
American male sculptors
Artists from Houston
Los Angeles City College alumni
Rutgers University faculty
University of Southern California alumni